On June 1, 2011, a total of six tornadoes touched down in both western Massachusetts and western Maine. The strongest was a long-track, high-end EF3 tornado that caused significant damage to the city of Springfield, Massachusetts as well as several adjacent cities and towns. By the end of the day, three people had been killed, at least 200 were injured, and over 500 families were left homeless.

Meteorological synopsis
On May 30, two days before the outbreak, the Storm Prediction Center (SPC) noted the possibility of a severe weather event in the Northeastern United States in their outlook. A storm system was forecast to draw warm, moist air (with dew points over ) from the south, ahead of a driving cold front. In light of this, the SPC issued a slight risk for severe thunderstorms across the area. As an upper-level trough moved over the Great Lakes, further moisture and warmth increased atmospheric instability in the area, raising the threat of a squall line or supercell thunderstorms. By June 1, the storm system moved over Ontario and Quebec, with a cold front trailing behind it over northern New England. CAPE values exceeded 4,000 J/kg, indicating an extreme amount of instability in the atmosphere, conducive to strong thunderstorms. Additionally, a strong upper-level jet stream brought significant wind shear, which, in combination with the atmospheric instability, indicated a significant severe weather threat, with the main effects expected to result from downburst winds and large hail, but with tornadoes possible. An EML, which emerged over Arizona on May 28, was also present and created abnormally steep lapse rates in the mid-levels of the atmosphere, further increasing instability.

Between 8:18 a.m. and 9:15 a.m. (EDT), severe storms producing  hail developed over portions of New Hampshire, Massachusetts and Maine; however, little if any impact resulted from these storms. At 10:05 a.m., the SPC issued a severe thunderstorm watch for the entire state of Vermont, much of northern New York, northeastern Pennsylvania and parts of western Massachusetts and Connecticut. By this time, a broken line of severe storms had developed over parts of western New York and northern Pennsylvania. With the storms gradually developing throughout the day and an increasing threat of tornadoes, a tornado watch was issued at 1:00 p.m. for much of New England, southern New York, eastern Pennsylvania and most of New Jersey. These storms gradually tracked east-southeastward into Vermont and later New Hampshire. One particular supercell produced very large  diameter hail at Shaftsbury, Vermont after producing a funnel cloud and baseball sized hail across the border in New York State. At 2:43 p.m., the first of several tornado warnings in the area was issued for southern Coos County, New Hampshire.

Between 3:00 and 3:30 p.m., severe storms developed over western Massachusetts and prompted a tornado warning to be issued at 3:28 p.m. for parts of Hampden, Hampshire and Franklin Counties. About an hour later, another warning was issued for Springfield, Massachusetts and surrounding areas. Within minutes, a touchdown was confirmed near Springfield by local law enforcement and amateur radio operators. This tornado was later rated a strong EF3 on the Enhanced Fujita Scale. At one point, this supercell displayed radar characteristics similar to historic supercells that produced violent tornadoes over the Southeast and the Great Plains. Over the next hour, damage was reported as far east as Southbridge from this long track tornado. Other brief touchdowns were reported across the state afterward as well, which caused minor damage.

In total, 10 towns and cities, Westfield, West Springfield, Springfield, Monson, Hampden, Wilbraham, Brimfield,  Sturbridge, Southbridge, and Charlton, Massachusetts, all sustained damage from the long track EF3 tornado . A total of three (downgraded from the originally reported 4) people were killed as a result of the tornado and at least 200 people were injured from severe weather across the state. The outbreak included the first killer tornado in Massachusetts since the 1995 Great Barrington tornado.

Confirmed tornadoes

Greater Springfield

On June 1, 2011, a strong, large, and long-lived tornado left a swath of major damage through Hampden County into Worcester County in Western Massachusetts. The city of Springfield was devastated by the June 1, 2011 tornado, as was the southern portion of the Springfield Metropolitan Area – from Westfield to Charlton. Massachusetts has experienced only eight EF3 or higher tornadoes since reliable records began to be kept in 1950, and this was the first on record in Hampden County. Overall, the tornado killed three people, injured about 200 others, and left hundreds homeless. In Springfield alone, approximately 500 buildings were destroyed. Hundreds of other homes were destroyed in surrounding towns, including West Springfield (88 structures) and Monson (77 structures), among others. Damage estimates from the storm, to date, exceed $140 million, the majority of which was from the destruction of homes and businesses.

The tornado first touched down at 4:17 p.m. EDT (20:17 UTC) in the Munger Hill section of Westfield, Massachusetts. Within Westfield, damage was mainly confined to trees but a local school did sustain roof damage. Once the tornado moved out of the City of Westfield and into the City of West Springfield, it rapidly intensified, causing extensive damage to industrial buildings, tearing off roofs and the upper floors of three-story apartment complexes. Additionally, a few homes collapsed due to the severity of structural damage. Throughout West Springfield, 88 buildings were destroyed and two people were killed. One woman was killed after her home collapsed on top of her while she was protecting her daughter.

The storm then crossed the Connecticut River and moved into Metro Center, the most urban area of the densely populated City of Springfield, destroying over 500 homes and buildings. The tornado caused extensive damage to Springfield's Connecticut River Walk Park, destroying much of the park's formerly lush tree canopy and large sections of its wrought-iron fences. Some 200-year-old Heritage Trees in Court Square were uprooted and commercial brick buildings in Springfield's historic South End sustained extensive damage – large portions of their roofs were torn off and numerous, ornate brick facades were completely destroyed. Severe structural damage to apartments and townhouses took place near famous Mulberry Street and due east on the campus of Springfield College. In the wealthy East Forest Park neighborhood, numerous houses were completely destroyed, and Cathedral High School sustained sufficient damage that it was eventually demolished. Springfield's Sixteen Acres neighborhood, a middle-class neighborhood – Springfield's most suburban in character – was similarly devastated.

Continuing eastward, the tornado tracked through Wilbraham, causing near-total deforestation and extensive structural damage. According to town administrator Robert Weitz, a total of 213 buildings in Wilbraham received damage from the tornado, 13 of which were destroyed. All injuries in Wilbraham were non life-threatening and relatively minor. The storm then moved through the center of Monson, damaging nearly every structure in the area. Many homes were badly damaged, some of which were completely flattened. A total of 77 buildings were destroyed, some completely. In some locations, trees were debarked and had most of their branches removed. Some unanchored homes in town slid from their foundations  and collapsed. The roof of the old Monson High School, which is now the town's police building, was also completely destroyed.

Thousands of trees were snapped and uprooted in this area. In Brimfield, a total of 192 buildings were damaged by the tornado, including several homes which were completely swept from their foundations. In East Brimfield, the Village Green campground was almost completely destroyed by the tornado. At the campground's trailer park, 95 out of 96 trailers were destroyed. One woman was killed at the trailer park after her RV was overturned by the tornado. Her boyfriend was critically injured; they both declined to vacate when the owners of the campground warned them of the approaching tornado and encouraged them to seek shelter. Losses at the Village Green campground exceeded $1 million. Moving southeast, the tornado then devastated the Quinebaug Cove campground in Brimfield, damaging or destroying an estimated 80 percent of the campground. Around 5:09 p.m., another tornado warning was issued to include portions of Norfolk County, Massachusetts and Providence County, Rhode Island.

The tornado then crossed into Worcester County, passing over East Brimfield Lake in the process. The tornado moved to the south of Fiskdale and struck the town of Sturbridge, where thousands of trees were downed and multiple homes were damaged. Significant damage took place to both buildings and trees for several miles before the storm moved into Southbridge. There, the Southbridge Airport sustained some damage and aircraft were picked up and thrown into the nearby woods. Once through the airport, the tornado ripped through the Rosemeade Apartments and devastated the neighborhood of Brookside Road, Charlton Street and Harrington Road at 5:18pm before it dissipated in southwestern Charlton at 5:27 p.m EDT (21:27 UTC).

Aftermath

Immediately following the storms, four people were reported dead. That number was later reduced to three as one Springfield man was found to have died of an unrelated heart attack prior to the tornado's impact. Hundreds of people were admitted to hospitals with injuries ranging from lightning strikes to trauma, and almost 500 people were forced to leave their homes, most of whom stayed in the MassMutual Center. Over two weeks later, more than 200 people were still homeless at the MassMutual Center in Springfield. In addition to the MassMutual Center, Tantasqua High School in Sturbridge and Brookfield Elementary School were opened up as emergency shelters. A Special Emergency Response Team was activated by the state police in order to search for missing people and those trapped underneath debris.

In Springfield, firefighters from Boston, Worcester, Newton, Waltham, Watertown, and Weston assisted in rescue efforts. Governor Deval Patrick also declared a state of emergency in Massachusetts, and activated 1,000 National Guard troops for rescue and recovery efforts. By June 2, six Red Cross shelters had been opened in the state and housed about 480 people. On June 2, 2011, the Business Improvement District of Hartford, Connecticut – Springfield's bi-state twin city – and the Downtown Boston Business Improvement District were helping the Springfield Business Improvement District with clean-up. Within two days of the tornadoes, the process of demolishing "structures beyond repair" began as local officials inspected hundreds of damaged homes. By June 7, three shelters remained open, housing 362 people. AmeriCorps NCCC (National Civilian Community Corps) deployed their nearby team, Summit 7 of Class 17, to aid the community in debris removal. Armed with chainsaws and other tools, the team spent several weeks helping residents clean up their homes and properties.

On June 15, the Federal Emergency Management Agency (FEMA) declared Hampden and Worcester Counties as major disaster areas, allowing for government aid to be distributed to affected residents. The following day, the number of insurance claims sharply rose from about 5,000 to 8,200. In addition to federal funds, state lawmakers passed a $50.3 million supplemental budget that included $15 million for emergency response, cleanup, and assistance and shelter to residents affected by the storms. By June 20, just over $1 million in individual aid had been provided to 254 households.  $3.9M in federal funds were given to cities and towns for emergency items including debris removal and road and sidewalk repair.  In addition to assistance from MassDOT and waiving of license replacement fees in June by the Massachusetts Registry of Motor Vehicles, Massport donated $300,000 in unused construction supplies from the Boston Logan Residential Soundproofing Program.

See also
 List of North American tornadoes and tornado outbreaks
 1953 Worcester tornado – High-end F4 tornado that caused catastrophic damage and loss of life in the city of Worcester and throughout central Massachusetts
 1989 Northeastern United States tornado outbreak – The previous tornado outbreak to affect the Northeast.
 1995 Great Barrington tornado – The third (and most recent) F4 tornado to affect Massachusetts

References

Notes

External links

Doppler weather radar reflectivities and velocities loops of the June 1 tornado outbreak
Time-lapse visualization of the June 1 tornado outbreak

06-01
F3 tornadoes by date
Tornadoes in Massachusetts
Tornadoes in Maine
Tornado,2011-06-01,Massachusetts
History of Springfield, Massachusetts
Massachusetts Tornado Outbreak